Edward Smith-Stanley, 13th Earl of Derby  (21 April 1775 – 30 June 1851), KG, of Knowsley Hall in Lancashire (styled Lord Stanley from 1776 to 1832, known as Baron Stanley of Bickerstaffe from 1832-4), was a politician, peer, landowner, builder, farmer, art collector and naturalist. He was the patron of the writer Edward Lear.

Origins
He was the eldest child and only son and heir of Edward Smith-Stanley, 12th Earl of Derby (1752-1834) by his wife Elizabeth Hamilton, a daughter of James Hamilton, 6th Duke of Hamilton.

Career
He was educated at Eton College and Trinity College, Cambridge. On 10 November 1796 he was appointed a Deputy Lieutenant of Lancashire and in the same year he was elected as a Member of Parliament for Preston. He held this seat until 1812 and then represented Lancashire until 1832, when he was ennobled as Baron Stanley of Bickerstaffe, of Bickerstaffe in the County Palatine of Lancaster.

Military career
He was commissioned Colonel of the 1st Royal Lancashire Supplementary Militia on 1 March 1797; this regiment subsequently became the 2nd Royal Lancashire Militia. He was breveted as a colonel in the regular Army with seniority from that date, retaining the rank until his regiment was disembodied, which occurred at the end of 1799. He resigned his commission as colonel on 13 April 1847.

Naturalist
In 1834 he succeeded his father as 13th Earl of Derby and withdrew from politics, instead concentrating on his natural history collection at Knowsley Hall, near Liverpool. He had a large collection of living animals: at his death, there were 1,272 birds and 345 mammals at Knowsley, shipped to England by explorers such as Joseph Burke. From 1828 to 1833 he was President of the Linnean Society. Many of Derby's collections are now housed in Liverpool's World Museum. Several species were named after him, for example the Derbyan parakeet, Psittacula derbiana and an Australian species of parrot named firstly by Nicholas Vigors as Platycercus stanleyii, in 1830 when he was Lord Stanley, and referred to in the vernacular as "The Earl of Derby’s Parrakeet" by the author John Gould in the sixth volume of his magnum opus Birds of Australia. However the latter species was found to have been named previously as Platycercus icterotis, and thus Platycercus stanleyii was found to have been an invalid name due to the pre-existence of a published description for the species, according to "the inviolable laws of precedence in deliberations on biological nomenclature". From the Earl of Derby's Collection, the State Library of NSW purchased six volumes of exquisite Australian natural history drawings dating from the early days of British settlement in NSW and this Library publishes talks and exhibitions of its research on this collection.

Marriage and issue

On 30 June 1798 he married his first cousin Charlotte Margaret Hornby (d.1817), second daughter of Rev. Geoffrey Hornby (1750-1812), of Scale Hall, near Lancaster in Lancashire, High Sheriff of Lancashire in 1774 and a Deputy Lieutenant of Lancashire, Colonel of a regiment of Lancashire militia, by his wife Lucy Smith-Stanley (d.1833) a daughter of James Smith-Stanley, Lord Strange (1716–1771), (son and heir apparent of Edward Stanley, 11th Earl of Derby (1689-1776)) and a sister of Edward Smith-Stanley, 12th Earl of Derby (1752-1834). Charlotte's brother was Edmund Hornby (1773-1857) of Dalton Hall, near Burton, Westmorland, a Member of Parliament for Preston, Lancashire, from 1812–1826, who married his first cousin Lady Charlotte Stanley (d.1805), a daughter of Edward Smith-Stanley, 12th Earl of Derby (1752-1834). By Charlotte Hornby, he had issue:
 Edward George Geoffrey Smith-Stanley, 14th Earl of Derby (1799–1869), thrice Prime Minister (1852, 1858–9, 1866–8)
 Lady Charlotte Elizabeth Smith-Stanley (1801–1853), married Edward Penrhyn
 Hon. Henry Thomas Smith-Stanley (1803–1875), MP for Preston (1832–7)
 Lady Emily Lucy Smith-Stanley (1804), died in infancy
 Lady Louisa Emily Stanley (1805–1825), married Lt.-Col. Samuel Long
 Lady Eleanor Mary Smith-Stanley (b. 1807)
 Colonel Hon. Charles James Fox Stanley (1808–1884)

Death
He died on 30 June 1851.

References

External links 
 
Stanley, Edward Smith, thirteenth earl of Derby (formerly Lord Stanley) (1775–1851), politician and naturalist by Clemency Thorne Fisher in Dictionary of National Biography

The TAL & Dai-ichi Life Derby Collection at the State Library of New South Wales

|-

1775 births
1851 deaths
People from Knowsley, Merseyside
People educated at Eton College
Alumni of Trinity College, Cambridge
British Militia officers
English ornithologists
Knights of the Garter
Lord-Lieutenants of Lancashire
Lancashire Militia officers
Smith-Stanley, Edward
Smith-Stanley, Edward
Smith-Stanley, Edward
Smith-Stanley, Edward
Smith-Stanley, Edward
Smith-Stanley, Edward
Smith-Stanley, Edward
Smith-Stanley, Edward
Smith-Stanley, Edward
Smith-Stanley, Edward
Smith-Stanley, Edward
Smith-Stanley, Edward
Smith-Stanley, Edward
Smith-Stanley, Edward
Smith-Stanley, Edward
Edward Stanley
Presidents of the Zoological Society of London
13
Members of the Privy Council of the United Kingdom
Parents of prime ministers of the United Kingdom
Peers of the United Kingdom created by William IV
Hulme Trust
Chetham Society